Huawei Ox Horn Campus is a European-themed model village constructed on the south shore of Songshan Lake, in Dongguan, Guangdong province, China.  It was constructed in the late-2010s to house the research and development offices of technology company Huawei.

There are twelve groups of buildings, based on European cities or regions, including Heidelberg Castle, and Cité Internationale Universitaire de Paris, plus one-to-one copies of the buildings of Český Krumlov, Verona, Bologna, Budapest, Tallinn, and Granada.  The zones are connected together using a tram system modelled on trains supplied by Stadler Rail for the Jungfrau Railway in Switzerland.

References

Further reading

 

High-tech architecture